Delbar Jan Arman, also Dilbar Jan Arman Shinwari is a politician from Jaji Maidan district of Khost, Afghanistan. He is the ex-governor of Badghis Province.

Delbar Jan Arman has a military and academic background. In the 1970s, he studied for six years at the American Technical College, Kabul. He was also trained in the Afghan Army.

From 2005 till 2009 he was the governor of Zabul Province, Afghanistan.  He was an anti-Soviet insurgent who fled to Pakistan during the Taliban's rule of Afghanistan.  He was appointed governor of Zabul on 3 March 2005 by President Hamid Karzai. Delbar Jan Arman is known for his intimate involvement with the U.S. Provincial Reconstruction Team based in Qalat and their combined efforts to quickly deploy development projects across the province. In May 2009 he switched positions with Mohammad Ashraf Naseri. Delbar Jan Arman became governor of Badghis Province, Mohammad Ashraf Naseri took over the Government of Zabul Province.

References

Governors of Badghis Province
Year of birth missing (living people)
Living people
Pashtun people
Governors of Zabul Province
Afghan expatriates in Pakistan
Afghan military personnel
Mujahideen members of the Soviet–Afghan War
People from Khost Province